This is a list of cancelled GameCube video games. The GameCube is a video game console released by Nintendo in 2001. After the decline in market share and loss of third party game developer support in the prior generation with the Nintendo 64, Nintendo worked to repair relationships with developers with the GameCube. While Nintendo's first party games generally sold well, many third party developed game sales lagged, leading Nintendo to work with third party's to help with publishing. While this helped, there were still many game's cancelled for the platform, between second and third party pitches being rejected by Nintendo, third party support being pulled due to lack of sales, and Nintendo themselves pushing games off to their next platform, the Wii, which released in late 2006. This list documents all known games that were confirmed for the GameCube at some point, but did not end up being released for it in any capacity.

List of cancelled GameCube games

References

 
GameCube games
GameCube